Simple Agi Ondh Love Story (or Simpalaag Ond Love Story) is a 2013 Indian Kannada-language romantic comedy film written and directed by Suni, and stars Rakshit Shetty and Shwetha Srivatsav. The film was remade in Telugu in 2018 as Idi Naa Love Story.

Plot
Kushal (Rakshit Shetty) is sent by his radio jockey sister Rachana to Polibetta located in Kodagu to meet her boyfriend's sister, Dr.Ithihasini, in the hope that the two will take a liking to each other, leading to marriage, and thus paving the way for her own marriage.

Kushal meets a bubbly girl (Shwetha Srivatsav) who claims to be Ithihasini, and says the rest of the family is out of town. The two share their past romantic liaisons. Ithihasini's actions seem a little odd and her responses to Kushal's questions all avoid direct answers so it's not really a surprise when Kushal's sister calls to tell him that the girl he has been spending time with is not Ithihasini at all. When confronted the fake Ithihasini comes up with a number of different stories, but Kushal finds her even more intriguing as a result and declares his love for her despite not knowing who she actually is, although he does finally discover her real name is Khushi. Khushi is suffering from anterograde amnesia (loss of memory), the story takes a drastic leap from here.

Cast
 Rakshit Shetty as Kushal
 Shwetha Srivatsav as Kushi
 RJ Rachana as Rachana
 Anusha Rao as Dr. Ithihasini
 Srinagar Kitty as Love Guru in a cameo appearance
 Ne La Narendra Babu in a special appearance as Kushal's lecturer
 Sandeep
 Vijeth 
 Shivani
 Varsha
 RJ Pradeep

Production
Simple Agi Ondh Love Story created a lot of buzz by its trailer where it had crossed more than a 100 thousand views in just 3 days. The trailer generated a lot of hype and curiosity among Kannada cine goers wherein the dialogues had become the talk of the town.

Filming
The film revolves only around two characters mainly the hero and the heroine and hence not much characters can be seen in the movie. 
The film was extensively shot in Pollibetta in Kodagu district of Karnataka and surrounding places near Madikeri and Chikmagalur during rainy season and had used a special camera to capture the nature lavishly.

Reception

Critical response 

Released with much hype and anticipation, the film received tremendous response from both the critics and audience. Shrikant Srinivasa from Rediff gave the movie a 4/5 and concluded "Simple Agi Ondh Love Story is a must-see film for all those in love, for the freshness in narration and dialogues". A critic from The Times of India scored the film at 4 out of 5 stars and says "Baanali badalaago and Smiliruvanthe Saraasari (sung by debut singer Priyanka Jois). Manohar Joshi’s camera is an added attraction to the story shot in the lush green locations of Kodagu. DI Sachin’s editing is remarkable". A critic from Bangalore Mirror scored the film at 2.5 out of 5 stars and wrote "The music is good; so is the cinematography. The film is worth a watch, perhaps for the attempt. Otherwise, watching 50 First Dates once again is not a bad idea".

Soundtrack

Bharath B. J. composed the music for the film and the soundtracks. The album has 9 soundtracks.

Awards
61st Filmfare Awards South
Won
 Best Lyricist - Siddu Kodipura - "Baanali Badalago"
 Best Playback Singer - Female - Sowmya Raoh - "Karagida Baaninalli"

Nominated
 Best Film
 Best Director - Suni
 Best Actress - Shwetha Srivatsav
 Best Music Director - Bharath B. J.
 Best Playback Singer - Male - Sonu Nigam - "Baanali Badalago"

Sequel
The film had a sequel under the same theme. Named "Simpallag Innondh Love Story", the sequel was released in March 2016 and did well at the box-office.

References

External links
 

2013 films
2010s Kannada-language films
2013 romantic comedy films
Indian romantic comedy films
Kannada films remade in other languages
Films directed by Suni